Peasholm may refer to:

 Peasholm Park, in Scarborough, North Yorkshire, England
 Peasholm railway station, southern terminus station of the North Bay Railway in Scarborough, North Yorkshire, England